Jacco Eltingh and Mark Koevermans were the defending champions, but Eltingh did not participate this year.  Koevermans partnered Marcelo Filippini, finishing runner-up.

Tomás Carbonell and Francisco Roig won in the final 6–3, 6–4, against Marcelo Filippini and Mark Koevermans.

Seeds

  Horacio de la Peña /  Vojtěch Flégl (first round)
  Marc-Kevin Goellner /  Lars Koslowski (first round)
  Marcelo Filippini /  Mark Koevermans (final)
  Murphy Jensen /  Olli Rahnasto (first round)

Draw

Draw

References
Draw

ATP Athens Open
1992 ATP Tour